The Big Con is a 2021 video game developed by Mighty Yell and published by Skybound Games.

The Big Con may also refer to:

 The Big Con: How the Consulting Industry Weakens our Businesses, Infantilizes our Governments and Warps our Economies, a 2023 book by Mariana Mazzucato and Rosie Collington
 The Big Con: The True Story of How Washington Got Hoodwinked and Hijacked by Crackpot Economics, a 2007 book by Jonathan Chait
 The Big Con, a 1940 book by David W. Maurer